Just Chillin is the fifth studio album by American guitarist and singer Norman Brown, released in July 2002 through Warner Bros. Records. The album was produced by Paul Brown and features guest vocal performances by Miki Howard, Michael McDonald, Chanté Moore and Debi Nova. Guest instrumentalists include Rick Braun, percussionists Lenny Castro and Paulinho da Costa, Jerry Hey, Pino Palladino on bass, James Poyser, and Bill Reichenbach Jr. on trombone. The album contains six tracks written or co-written by Brown, a cover version of Janet Jackson's "Let's Wait Awhile" and three additional songs.

In the United States, Just Chillin reached peak positions of number 198 on the Billboard 200, number two on Billboard Top Contemporary Jazz Albums chart, number six on the Top Heatseekers chart, number three on the Top Jazz Albums chart and number 50 on the Top R&B Albums chart. In 2003, the album earned Brown the Grammy Award for Best Pop Instrumental Album.

Composition
Just Chillin, produced by Paul Brown, contains ten tracks totaling approximately 45 minutes in length. The album has a relaxed mood generated by Brown's "gentle riffs and chords", a quality continued from his previous studio album Celebration (1999). Tracks include "light grooving instrumentals" and "unhurried romantic forays" with vocals by Miki Howard, Michael McDonald, Chanté Moore and Debi Nova. Backing vocals are supplied by Maya Azucena and Leela James. According to Brown, these guest vocalists marked his "introduction to vocals". Guest instrumentalists include: Rick Braun, percussionists Lenny Castro and Paulinho da Costa, Jerry Hey, Pino Palladino on bass, James Poyser, and Bill Reichenbach Jr. on trombone.

"The Feeling I Get", "Just Chillin'", and the Latin-influenced "Dancing in the House", are all original compositions by Brown; the latter two are considered moderately upbeat. "Night Drive", "Won't You Stay", and "In My Life" are also credited in part to Brown. "Night Drive", co-written by Phil Davis, contains a trumpet performance by Braun. In addition to Brown, "Won't You Stay" was co-written by Vikter Duplaix and James Poyser; "In My Life" was co-written by Edwin Lugo. The album also includes "Feeling the Way"  (Derek Allen, Juanita Wynn), John Stoddart's "I Still Believe", a cover version of Janet Jackson's "Let's Wait Awhile" (Melanie Andrews, Jackson, Jimmy Jam, Terry Lewis), and Christopher Bolden's "Not Like You Do."

Reception

Just Chillin received less than favorable critical reception. Allmusic's Matt Collar awarded the album two out of five stars and noted his preference for Brown's 1994 studio album After the Storm. Collar thought that Brown incorporated too many programmed drums and "mid-tempo jams", producing more "urban and gritty" tracks than his other instrumental albums. He compared "The Feeling I Get" to "instrumental Maxwell" and called Janet Jackson's "Let's Wait Awhile" a standout track which reflects Brown's "overall vision to turn jazz to pop and vice versa". Chris Walker of JazzTimes also noted the album's laid-back pace ("almost too relaxed") and thought it lacked Brown's "trademark zestfulness". Walker complimented the vocalists' performances, which produced a "pleasant, soulful aura", but felt they were "far removed" from Brown. He wrote that "Just Chillin'" and "Dancing in the House" displayed Brown's acumen; Walker also complimented "Night Drive", in part because of Braun's trumpet performance, and considered "Let's Wait Awhile" the highlight of the album. In 2003, the album earned Brown the Grammy Award for Best Pop Instrumental Album.

Track listing

Track listing adapted from Allmusic.

Personnel

Personnel
 Alex Al – bass
 Maya Azucena – backing vocals
 Pablo Batista – percussion
 Christopher Bolden – arranger, drum programming, keyboards
 Rick Braun – flugelhorn, trumpet
 Norman Brown – acoustic guitar, backing vocals, guitar
 Lenny Castro – percussion
 D.O.A. – arranger, bass, guitar, keyboards
 Paulinho da Costa – percussion
 Phil Davis – arranger, drum programming, keyboards
 Jenni Fujita – backing vocals
 Jerry Hey – flugelhorn, horn arrangements
 Miki Howard – vocals
 Herman Jackson – keyboards
 Leela James – backing vocals
 Edwin Lugo – backing vocals, composer
 Tony Maiden – guitar
 Michael McDonald – vocals
 Chanté Moore – vocals
 Debi Nova – vocals
 Pino Palladino – bass
 Ricky Peterson – keyboards
 James Poyser – keyboards
 Bill Reichenbach Jr. – trombone
 Lil' John Roberts – drums
 John Jubu Smith – acoustic guitar
 John Stoddart – arranger, backing vocals, drums, keyboards
 Juanita Wynn – backing vocals

Production
 Anthony Bell – engineer
 Bo Boddie – engineer
 Doug Boehm – assistant engineer
 Bob Brockman – mixing, producer
 Norman Brown – producer
 Paul Brown – engineer, mixing, producer
 D.C. – digital editing
 D.O.A. – producer, programming
 Timothy Day – engineer
 Vikter Duplaix – producer, programming
 Jan Fairchild – mixing
 Yaron Fuchs – mixing, producer
 Gregory Muntana Gilmer – art direction, design
 Robert Hadley – mastering
 Wayne Holmes – assistant engineer
 Victor McCoy – assistant engineer
 Ryan Moys – engineer
 Don Murray – engineer
 James Poyser – producer
 Josean Posey – engineer
 Doug Sax – mastering
 Bill Schnee – engineer
 Lexy Shroyer – production coordination
 Jon Smeltz – engineer
 John Stoddart – programming
 Dana Watson – production coordination
 Krystof Zizka – engineer
 Erik Zobler – digital editing, engineer

Credits adapted from Allmusic.

Chart performance
In the United States, Just Chillin reached peak positions of number 198 on the Billboard 200, number two on Billboard Top Contemporary Jazz Albums chart, number six on the Top Heatseekers chart, number three on the Top Jazz Albums chart and number 50 on the Top R&B Albums chart. The album remained on the Billboard 200 for one week, the Top Jazz Albums chart for fifty weeks and the Top R&B Albums chart for eight weeks. In 2003, Just Chillin re-entered the Top Contemporary Jazz Albums chart at number 22. The May 31, 2003 issue of Billboard, which featured the annual "Jazz Spotlight" and covered jazz music between the December 7, 2002 and May 3, 2003 issues of the magazine, included the album at number eight on its list of the "Top Contemporary Jazz Albums".

See also

 List of smooth jazz musicians

References

2002 albums
Grammy Award for Best Contemporary Instrumental Album
Norman Brown (guitarist) albums
Smooth jazz albums
Soul jazz albums
Warner Records albums